Wayne Hagin (born February 17, 1956) is an American sportscaster, best known as a radio play-by-play announcer for various Major League Baseball teams during his career.

Born in Denver, Colorado, Hagin moved with his family to San Jose, California, where he graduated from Blackford High School in 1974. He attended San Diego State University, graduating in 1979 with a bachelor's degree in radio in television.

Hagin's first play-by-play assignment was with the Oakland Athletics from 1981–84, followed by stints with the San Francisco Giants from 1987–88, the Chicago White Sox from 1989–91, the Colorado Rockies from 1993 (the team's inaugural season) to 2002, the St. Louis Cardinals from 2003-06, and the New York Mets from 2008-11.

Hagin was named Colorado Sportscaster of the Year in 2000 by the National Sportscasters and Sportswriters Association.

References

1956 births
Living people
American radio sports announcers
Chicago White Sox announcers
Colorado Rockies announcers
Major League Baseball broadcasters
New York Mets announcers
Oakland Athletics announcers
San Diego State University alumni
San Francisco Giants announcers
Sportspeople from Denver
St. Louis Cardinals announcers